The 1980–81 Cheshire County Football League was the 57th in the history of the Cheshire County League, a football competition in England. Teams were divided into two divisions.

Division One

The division featured two new teams, both promoted from last season's Division Two:
 Prescot Town  (1st), changed their name to Prescot Cables
 Kirkby Town (3rd)

League table

Division Two

The division featured five new teams:
 2 relegated from last seasons Division One:
 Rhyl (19th)
 Radcliffe Borough (20th)
 3 joined the division:
 Leyland Motors, from Lancashire Combination
 Atherton Laburnum Rovers, from Bolton Combination
 Salford, merger of Anson Villa and Salford Amateurs

League table

References

Cheshire County League